The Beneteau First 285 is a French sailboat, that was designed by Group Finot and first built in 1985. The design is out of production.

Production
The boat was built by Beneteau in France and the United States. A total of 451 were completed during the design's production run from 1985 to 1993.

Design

The First 285 is a small recreational keelboat, built predominantly of glassfibre, with wood trim. It has a fractional sloop rig, an internally-mounted spade-type rudder and a fixed fin keel. It displaces  and carries  of ballast.

See also
List of sailing boat types
Similar sailboats
Alerion Express 28
Aloha 28
Beneteau Oceanis 281
Bristol Channel Cutter
Cal 28
Catalina 28
Cumulus 28
Grampian 28
Hunter 28
Hunter 28.5
Hunter 280
O'Day 28
Pearson 28
Sabre 28
Sea Sprite 27
Sirius 28
Tanzer 8.5
Tanzer 28
TES 28 Magnam
Viking 28

References

External links

Sailing yachts
Keelboats
1980s sailboat type designs
Sailboat types built by Beneteau
Sailboat type designs by Groupe Finot